Dick Kaysø, (born 13 February 1947) is a Danish actor.

Filmography 
 Mafiaen, det er osse mig (1974)
 Piger i trøjen (1975)
 Strømer (1976)
 Julefrokosten (1976)
 Affæren i Mølleby (1976)
  (1976)
  (1976)
  (1977)
  (1977)
  (1979)
  (1980)
 Olsen-banden over alle bjerge (1981)
  (1982)
  (1982)
  (1983)
  (1983)
 Valhalla (1986)
 Peter von Scholten (1987)
 Ved vejen (1988)
  (1989)
  (1990)
  (1990)
 Krummerne (1991)
  (1992)
 Det forsømte forår (1993)
  (1994)
 Riget I (1994)
  (1994)
  (1994)
  (1996)
  (1998)
  (2001)
 Jolly Roger (2001)
  (2002)
 Arven (2003)
  (2003)
 Krøniken (2004–2007)
  (2006)

References

External links 
 
 
 

1947 births
20th-century Danish male actors
21st-century Danish male actors
Danish male film actors
Living people